Thomas William Egan (1872–1946) was a Welsh professional association footballer who played as an inside forward. Egan played in the Football League for Ardwick, Burnley, Sheffield United and Lincoln City. He was awarded one cap for the Wales national football team for the match against Scotland on 26 March 1892.

He started his career with his local side, Chirk F.C. as a teenager and graduated to the first team in 1891. Shortly afterwards, he moved to Manchester to join Fairfield. In the summer of 1893, he joined  Ardwick before moving on to Burnley. After a month with Ashton North End in May 1895, he joined Sheffield United in November, where he replaced his former Chirk team-mate, Joe Davies. Described as a "tricky player" who had a "fine shot at goal", Egan could play in any of the forward positions.

After a season in Sheffield, in which he scored four goals from 15 league appearances, Egan moved on to Lincoln City before dropping into non-league football in 1897. After a further four years, in which he played for five clubs, he retired to return to his home town.

He later moved to Derbyshire where he worked as a miner, dying in Tibshelf in 1946. Two of his sons, Harry and Doug became professional footballers, the former with Brighton, Southend United, Aldershot and Cardiff City and the latter with Derby County and Aldershot.

References

1872 births
People from Chirk
Sportspeople from Wrexham County Borough
1946 deaths
Welsh footballers
Wales international footballers
Association football inside forwards
English Football League players
Chirk AAA F.C. players
Burnley F.C. players
Sheffield United F.C. players
Lincoln City F.C. players
Stockport County F.C. players
Darwen F.C. players
Manchester City F.C. players
People from Tibshelf
Footballers from Derbyshire